Zubovka is a rural locality (a selo) in Chernoyarsky District, Astrakhan Oblast, Russia. The population was 1,352 as of 2010. There are 28 streets.

Geography 
Zubovka is located 14 km north of Chyorny Yar (the district's administrative centre) by road. Baranovka is the nearest rural locality.

References 

Rural localities in Chernoyarsky District